Newcastle Independent School District is a public school district based in Newcastle, Texas (USA).

The district has one school that serves students in grades pre-kindergarten through twelve.

Academic achievement
In 2009, the school district was rated "exemplary" by the Texas Education Agency.

Special programs

Athletics
Newcastle High School High School plays six-man football.

See also

List of school districts in Texas

References

External links
 

School districts in Young County, Texas